State Road 115 (NM 115) is a  state highway in the US state of New Mexico. NM 115's eastern terminus is at County Route 455 (CR 455), and the western terminus is at U.S. Route 84 (US 84) south of Cebolla.

Major intersections

See also

References

115
Transportation in Rio Arriba County, New Mexico